Xanthanomis is a genus of moths of the family Erebidae. The genus was erected by George Hampson in 1926.

Species
Xanthanomis aurantiaca Hampson, 1926 New Guinea
Xanthanomis eurogramma Hampson, 1926 New Guinea
Xanthanomis fuscifrons (Walker, [1863]) northern Australia, Sarawak
Xanthanomis lilacea (Bethune-Baker, 1906) New Guinea

References

Calpinae
Noctuoidea genera